Fossey may refer to:

 23032 Fossey, a main-belt asteroid
 Brigitte Fossey (born 1947), French actress
 Charles Fossey (1869–1946), French assyriologist
 Dian Fossey (1932–1985), American zoologist
 F. J. C. Hearnshaw (1869–1946), English professor of history
 Koen Fossey (born 1953), Belgian illustrator
 Steve Fossey, British astronomer

See also 

 Fosseys